UFC Fight Night: Magny vs. Ponzinibbio (also known as UFC Fight Night 140) was a mixed martial arts event produced by the Ultimate Fighting Championship that was held on November 17, 2018 at Estadio Mary Terán de Weiss in Buenos Aires, Argentina.

Background
The event marked the promotion's first visit to Argentina.

A welterweight bout between Neil Magny and Santiago Ponzinibbio headlined the event.

Veronica Macedo was expected to face Maryna Moroz at the event. However, Macedo pulled out of the fight due to an injury and was replaced by KSW Women's Flyweight Champion and promotional newcomer Ariane Lipski. In turn, Moroz pulled out due to injury on October 30 and as a result the bout was cancelled.

Claudio Puelles was scheduled to face Devin Powell at the event. However, Puelles pulled out of the bout in mid-October with an undisclosed injury and was replaced by promotional newcomer Jesus Pinedo.

A middleweight bout between Jared Cannonier and Alessio Di Chirico was scheduled to the event. However, on October 20, it was reported that Cannonier would meet former WSOF Middleweight and Light Heavyweight Champion David Branch at UFC 230 instead. Initially, it was not sure if a replacement will be sought from the UFC. Ultimately, Di Chirico was pulled from the card.

The Ultimate Fighter: Latin America 2 lightweight winner Enrique Barzola was expected to face Nad Narimani at the event. However, on October 26, it was reported that Barzola pulled out of the bout due to an arm injury and was replaced by promotional newcomer Sergio Giglio. In turn on November 8, it was reported that Giglio was forced out due to injury and was replaced by fellow newcomer Anderson dos Santos.

Tom Breese was expected to face The Ultimate Fighter: Brazil middleweight winner Cezar Ferreira at the event. However, on November 9, it was announced that he pulled out of the event due to injury and was replaced by promotional newcomer Ian Heinisch.

At the weigh-ins, Cynthia Calvillo weighed in at 118 lb, 2 pounds over the strawweight non-title fight limit of 116 lb. She was fined 20 percent of her purse, which went to her opponent Poliana Botelho and the bout proceeded at catchweight.

Results

Bonus awards
The following fighters were awarded $50,000 bonuses:
 Fight of the Night: Laureano Staropoli vs. Hector Aldana
Performance of the Night: Santiago Ponzinibbio and Johnny Walker

See also
List of UFC events
2018 in UFC
List of current UFC fighters

References

UFC Fight Night
2018 in mixed martial arts
2018 in Argentine sport
Sports competitions in Buenos Aires
Mixed martial arts in Argentina
November 2018 sports events in South America